Sveti Andrija (Croatian for "Saint Andrew") may refer to:

 Sveti Andrija (Dubrovnik), an uninhabited island near Dubrovnik
 Sveti Andrija (Rovinj) or Crveni Otok, an island off the coast of Rovinj
 Sveti Andrija (Vis) or Svetac, an island near the island of Vis
 Sveti Andrija (Komiža), a village on the island of Sveti Andrija or Svetac, in the town of Komiža, Croatia

See also
 Saint Andrew (disambiguation)